The Catholic Media Council (CAMECO) is a consultancy specialising in media and communications in Africa, Asia, Latin America, Central and Eastern Europe, the Middle East and the Pacific. The overall aim of CAMECO's services, publications and resources is to contribute to the capacity building of partners and to empower community-oriented media and communication initiatives.

We screen projects, coordinate evaluations, facilitate planning and change processes, and conduct training courses. CAMECO offers these services to local partners, organisations that are active in delivering media assistance, and to donors – among them many faith-based agencies. The electronic newsletter "CAMECO Update" informs about CAMECO's current activities.  

Collaborators in this initiative include media assistance organisations, researchers, and other media and development practitioners.

See also
Catholic television
Catholic television channels
Catholic television networks

References

External links

mediaME-Wiki

Catholic organizations
Communications and media organisations based in Germany
Catholic media
Organisations based in North Rhine-Westphalia